Ray Bower (5 January 1923 – 16 May 1995) was  a former Australian rules footballer who played with Richmond and Essendon in the Victorian Football League (VFL).

Notes

External links 		
		
		
		
		
		
		
		
1923 births		
1995 deaths		
Australian rules footballers from Victoria (Australia)		
Richmond Football Club players		
Essendon Football Club players
Castlemaine Football Club players